Utsav Pankaj Madan is an Indian cricketer. He made his List A debut for Arunachal Pradesh in the 2018–19 Vijay Hazare Trophy on 19 September 2018. He made his first-class debut for Arunachal Pradesh in the 2018–19 Ranji Trophy on 22 December 2018.

References

External links
 

Year of birth missing (living people)
Living people
Indian cricketers
Arunachal Pradesh cricketers
Place of birth missing (living people)